Blue Songs is a 1929 Paramount musical short film directed by Joseph Santley and starring Ruth Etting. The film included the songs "Because My Baby Don't Mean 'Maybe' Now" and "Roses of Yesterday."

References

1929 films
Paramount Pictures short films
1929 musical films
American musical films
American black-and-white films
1920s American films